Epigomphus crepidus is a species of dragonfly in the family Gomphidae. It is endemic to Mexico, where it inhabits the Pacific slope of southern Mexico in the states of Nayarit and Oaxaca. Its natural habitats are subtropical or tropical moist lowland forests and rivers. It is threatened by habitat loss.

References

Sources

Gomphidae
Endemic insects of Mexico
Jalisco dry forests
Fauna of the Southern Pacific dry forests
Taxonomy articles created by Polbot
Insects described in 1936